Gentiana pennelliana, is a rare species of flowering plant in the genus Gentiana. It is commonly known as wiregrass gentian and grows in sections of the Florida panhandle.

Gentiana pennelliana was first described by Merritt Lyndon Fernald in 1940 and was named after American botanist Francis Whittier Pennell.

This North American flowering plant is endemic to parts of the Florida panhandle, where it occurs naturally in pine flatwoods, wet prairies and seepage slopes. It is adapted to fires and flowers in November to December, prolifically when stimulated by fires.

References

pennelliana
Flora of the Southeastern United States
Flora of Florida
Plants described in 1940
Flora without expected TNC conservation status